HMS Herald was an 18-gun ship-sloop of the Cormorant class in the Royal Navy, launched in 1806 at Littlehampton. In 1810 she was reclassed as a 20-gun sixth rate ship (but without being re-armed), and again re-rated as 24 guns in 1817, just before she was broken up.

Adriatic
Herald was commissioned in March 1806 under Captain G. M. Hony. On 18 May 1807 he sailed her to the Mediterranean, where he proceeded to cruise off Corfu in the early stages of the Adriatic campaign. Herald attacked French shipping off the island and later in the year cruised off the Dardanelles before returning to the Adriatic off Otranto, attacking a number of coastal merchant vessels with success.

On 25 October 1807, Herald  was off Otranto when she found an armed trabaccolo anchored under the fortress. Despite resistance, Herald's boats cut out the vessel, which turned out to be the French privateer César, armed with four 6-pounders. César was sailing from Ancona to Corfu with a cargo of rice and flour. All but four of the crew escaped. Herald suffered four men wounded.

In January 1808 Commander George Jackson took command. Herald operated off the Italian coasts, capturing or destroying numerous French and Italian merchant ships during the year.

In August 1810 Herald was re-rated as a 20-gun post ship, though Jackson did not receive his promotion until one year later, in August 1811. In the meantime, on 9 May 1811, boats from Herald and  cut out four coasting vessels from the town of Monastarrachi.

War of 1812
On 4 July 1812, Jackson sailed Herald for Jamaica. There she captured the American ship Venus on 17 December.

On 1 January 1813, Captain Clement Milward was nominated Acting-Captain of Herald; he was confirmed in the position on 28 May. Captain Milward took command of Herald off Halifax, Nova Scotia.

Operating off the American coast during the War of 1812, Herald captured one English, one French and four American vessels during 1813, all of which she sent to Nassau, New Providence.
English vessel Lune, in ballast, taken 3 June;
French vessel Vengeance, carrying wine, silks, &c. taken 27 June;
American vessel Adeline Cecilia, in ballast, taken 13 August 1813; 
American vessel Jane, carrying cotton and sugar, taken 13 December 1813; 
American vessel Eliza and Ann, carrying sundries, taken 21 December; and
American vessel Liberty, carrying sundries, taken 23 December.

In 1814, Herald took part in the Gulf Campaign. From March 1814 onwards, under orders of Captain Milward of Herald, was sent to patrol off the Mississippi, and would remain here for the rest of the year. Under the rules of prize-money, Herald shared in the proceeds of the capture of six American vessels in the Battle of Lake Borgne on 14 December 1814.

In accordance with Cochrane's orders, Herald moored off Prospect Bluff, and on 5 April 1815 embarked troops of the 5th Battalion of the West India Regiment. She arrived in Jamaica on 10 May. Herald accompanied a convoy, arriving in Portsmouth on 25 September. Captain Milward left Herald on 11 October 1815.

Fate
On 9 September 1817, Herald was broken up at Chatham Naval Dockyard.

Notes

Citations

References

External links
 Ships of the Old Navy

 

Cormorant-class ship-sloops
1806 ships
Ships built in England
War of 1812 ships of the United Kingdom